The governors general of the French Antilles, or lieutenants-general, were the king's representatives in the French West Indies colonies under the Ancien Régime.
The colonies were, by date of foundation, Saint-Christophe (1625), Saint-Domingue (1627), Saint Martin (1635), Martinique (1635), Guadeloupe (1635), Dominica (1635), Saint Barthélemy (1648), Grenada (1650), Saint Croix (1650), Saint Lucia (1660), Tobago (1678), the Grenadines and Saint Vincent (1699).

History

The position was created in 1628, formally named the "Governor-general of the islands and mainland of America" (Gouverneur général des Isles et Terre Ferme de l'Amérique).
The first office holder was Pierre Belain d'Esnambuc, who had founded the colony of Saint Christophe (Saint Kitts) in 1625, the first French colony in the region.
The governor general lived in Basseterre Saint Christophe. 
Jean-Charles de Baas moved the governor's residence from Saint-Christophe to Martinique, first to Saint-Pierre in 1671, then to Fort-Royal in 1674.

The position was split in 1714.
The colony of Saint-Domingue (Haiti) in the Greater Antilles was assigned to the Governor General of Saint-Domingue, while the islands of the Lesser Antilles from Guadeloupe to Tobago were assigned to the Governor General of the Windward Islands (Gouverneur général des Isles du Vent).
The position was suppressed on 23 March 1794 after the occupation of the French colonies by the British. 
During the French Second Republic the position was restored in March 1849, but definitively removed in November 1851.

Functions

The governor-general of the islands and mainland of America was the representative of the King of France in the French West Indies. 
The position of governor general was generally entrusted to members of the nobility of the Kingdom of France, except under the Second Republic.
His main functions were administrative and military. He enforced laws and customs.

Beside the governor general, during certain periods the king appointed local governors (gouverneurs particuliers) to administer each of the main islands or groups of islands. 
The English occupations, first of Guadeloupe in 1759, then of Martinique in 1762, marked a change in the administration of the Windward Islands. 
Each of the main islands was given an administrative authority. 
The English rule was preserved during the return of these islands to France after the Treaty of Paris (1763) and the main Windward Islands each hosted a local governor. 
The governor general (or lieutenant-general) of the Windward Islands was the superior of the local governors of each territory. 
Sometimes one person combined the two functions.

Along with lieutenant-generals and local governors, the royal power soon installed intendents with jurisdiction over justice, police, and especially finance. 
The intendants had the civil power, while the lieutenants-general had military power. 
The residence of the intendant general was always in Martinique.

Governors  general

Gouverneurs généraux des Isles et Terre Ferme de l'Amérique (1626–1714)

Gouverneurs généraux des Isles du Vent (1714–1794)

Gouverneurs généraux des Îles du Vent (1849–1851)

See also  
 List of colonial governors and administrators of Saint Christopher (1625–1702)
 List of colonial and departmental heads of Guadeloupe (1635–1943)
 List of colonial and departmental heads of Martinique (1635–1947)
 List of colonial governors of Saint-Domingue (1640–1798)
 List of colonial governors and administrators of Grenada (1649–1763)

Notes

Citations

Sources 

 Annuaire de la Martinique, Page XXXIII à LXXXV -Imprimerie du Gouvernement – Année commune 1893 – 

Lists of French colonial governors and administrators
French Caribbean
History of Dominica
History of Grenada
History of Guadeloupe
History of Martinique
History of Saint Kitts and Nevis
History of Saint Lucia
History of Trinidad and Tobago